John Higgins (1903 – 23 October 1955) was an Irish Gaelic footballer who played as a right centre half-back  for the Kildare senior team.

Higgins made his debut during the 1925 championship and was a regular member of the starting fifteen until his retirement a decade later. During that time he won two All-Ireland medals and seven Leinster medals. Higgins was an All-Ireland runner-up on four occasions.

At club level Higgins was a six-time county club championship medalist with Naas.

References

 

1903 births
1955 deaths
Kildare inter-county Gaelic footballers
Leinster inter-provincial Gaelic footballers
Naas Gaelic footballers
Winners of two All-Ireland medals (Gaelic football)